Hamblyn is a surname. Notable people with the surname include:

 Richard Hamblyn (born 1965), British environmental writer and historian
 Bernadette Hamblyn, fictional character in New Zealand soap opera Shortland Street

See also
 Hamblen
 Hamblin (surname)